Keep Moving is the fifth studio album by the English ska/pop band Madness. It was originally released in February 1984, and was their final album on the Stiff label. It's notably the band's last studio album to feature their keyboardist and founding member Mike Barson, before the band split in 1986.

Keep Moving peaked at No. 6 in the UK Albums Chart, and two singles from the album reached the Top 20 in the UK Singles Chart. It also reached number 109 on the US Billboard 200, their highest position in the United States. The album received some good reviews, with Rolling Stone magazine giving the album four out of five stars, applauding the band's changing sound, and NME ranking it number 13 among the "Albums of the Year" for 1984. This was an improvement, as the last album reviewed by the magazine, Absolutely, was heavily criticised.

The album was re-released in the United Kingdom in June 2010 on the Salvo/Union Square label, featuring bonus material. The reissue is a 2-CD set with the original album digitally remastered; the bonus content consists of associated singles, 12" mixes and B-sides. It also features liner notes written by comedian and Madness fan Phill Jupitus.

Background
On 5 October 1983, the band were rehearsing and discussing a possible television series, which was being written for them by Ben Elton and Richard Curtis. Barson then informed the band that he would not be able to take part, as he was tired of the music business and wanted to spend more time with his wife. They had recently relocated to Amsterdam. Barson agreed to finish recording the album Keep Moving and left after playing for the last time with the band at the Lyceum Ballroom on 21 December 1983. After leaving the band, James Mackie took Barson's place, appearing with Madness on the US hit television show Saturday Night Live on 14 April 1984. After leaving the band, Barson returned to the UK for the filming of two music videos, "Michael Caine" and "One Better Day", as he'd played on the tracks. He officially left the band in June 1984, following the release of the "One Better Day" single. Paul Carrack took Barson's place whilst the band toured America in early 1984.

The album takes its name from a phrase used repeatedly in the 1970 post-apocalyptic film The Bed Sitting Room.

The album cover was based on a suggestion by Stiff's boss Dave Robinson that it should reflect the forthcoming Olympics.

USA/Canadian version
This pressing has a different running order to the UK version and includes the singles "Wings of a Dove" and "The Sun and the Rain" in place of "Waltz Into Mischief" and "Time for Tea" (although the cassette and CD both include all 14 tracks). The version of "The Sun and the Rain" used here, and also issued as a single in North America, has an edited outro, reducing the length by some 12 seconds. A vinyl picture disc version, using the USA/Canadian track listing, was also issued in the UK.

Track listing

UK

US/CAN

2010 reissue
CD 1
The original album
The first disc contains the twelve tracks from the original UK album version and four promo videos.

The promo videos
 "Wings of a Dove"
 "The Sun and the Rain"
 "Michael Caine"
 "One Better Day"

CD 2

Personnel

Madness
Graham "Suggs" McPherson – lead vocals
Mike Barson – keyboards, harmonica
Chris Foreman – guitar
Mark Bedford – bass guitar
Lee Thompson – saxophones
Dan Woodgate – drums
Cathal Smyth – backing vocals, trumpet, lead vocals on "Michael Caine" and "Victoria Gardens"

Additional personnel
General Public (Dave Wakeling and Ranking Roger) – backing vocals on "Waltz Into Mischief" and "Victoria Gardens" 
Afrodiziak (Caron Wheeler, Claudia Fontaine and Naomi Thompson) – backing vocals on "Michael Caine"
Michael Caine – voice on "Michael Caine" 
Luís Jardim – percussion
The TKO Horns (Dave Pleurs, Alan Whetton, Jim Patterson and Brian Maurice) – horns on "Keep Moving"
David Bedford – string arrangements

Technical personnel
Clive Langer – producer
Alan Winstanley – producer
Carb – engineer
Gavin Greenaway – engineer
Matt Butler – engineer
Steve Churchyard – engineer
Jim Russell – mixing
Phil Tennant – mixing
Denis Blackham – mastering
Tony Duffy – photography
Matthew Sztumpf – management

2010 reissue personnel
Creighton Steel Sounds – steel band on "Wings of a Dove"
Miguel Barradas – steel band arrangement on "Wings of a Dove"
The Pentecostal First Born Church of the Living God – choir on "Wings of a Dove"
David Bedford – string arrangements on "The Sun and the Rain"
Dick Cuthell – trumpet on "The Sun and the Rain"; flugelhorn and cornet on "My Girl" (live version)
Cal Verney – cello on "My Girl" (live version)
Suzanne Rosenfeld – viola on "My Girl" (live version)
Jonathan Kahan – violin on "My Girl" (live version)
Nick Parker – violin on "My Girl" (live version)
Gary Barnacle – saxophone on "Victoria Gardens" (remix)
Peter Thoms – trombone on "Victoria Gardens" (remix)
Luke Tunney – trumpet on "Victoria Gardens" (remix)
Madness – producer on "Behind the 8 Ball", "One's Second Thoughtlessness" and "Fireball XL5"
Ian Horne – producer on "Fireball XL5" and "Sarah"  
Mark O'Donoughue – engineer on "One's Second Thoughtlessness"
Tim Turan – remastering
Martin "Cally" Callomon – art direction, design 
The Stiff Art Department – original graphic design 
Nik Rose – artwork ("re-jigging and fettling")
Phill Jupitus – liner notes

Chart performance

Certifications and sales

See also
 List of albums released in 1984
 Madness' discography

References

External links

1984 albums
Madness (band) albums
Stiff Records albums
Albums produced by Alan Winstanley
Albums produced by Clive Langer